MFK Dolný Kubín is a Slovak football club located in Dolný Kubín. Since the 2009–10 season, the club played in the I.liga, which is the second division of Slovak football. The team plays at stadium Ivana Chodáka where the 2009 Slovak Super Cup between Slovan and Košice was played.

Current squad 
As of 24 January 2023

*

For recent transfers, see List of Slovak football transfers winter 2022–23

Out on loan 2022–23

Notable players 
Had international caps for their respective countries

For full list, see here

 Gagik Daghbashyan
 Dušan Galis
 Marián Had
 Róbert Hanko
 Anatol Cheptine
 Maroš Klimpl
 Matúš Kozáčik
  Ladislav Pecko
 Siradji Sani
  Dušan Tittel
 Ivan Trabalík

Managers

 Vladimír Goffa (Oct 2008-Jan 2010)
 Petar Kurćubić (Jul 2009-Sep 2011)
 Ladislav Molnár (Jul 2012-Jul 2013)
 Jozef Sino (Jul 2013-Dec 2014)
 Pavol Bača (Jan 2015-Sep 2015)
 Marco Ragini (Jul 2015-May 2016)
 Pavol Bača (Jul 2016-Jul 2022)
 Ladislav Pecko (Jul 2022-Jan 2023)
 Ján Haspra (Jan 2023–)

References

External links 
  
 

 
Football clubs in Slovakia
Association football clubs established in 1920
1920 establishments in Slovakia